The 2008 Stanford Cardinal football team represented Stanford University in the 2008 NCAA Division I FBS football season. The team's head coach was Jim Harbaugh, who entered his second year at Stanford. The team played their home games at Stanford Stadium in Stanford, California and competed in the Pacific-10 Conference. The Cardinal improved on their  4–8 record from the 2007 season by going 5–7. After winning back the Stanford Axe from rival California in 2007 for the first time in five years, Stanford lost the Axe to Cal in the 2008 Big Game.

Schedule

Schedule Source: 2008 Stanford Cardinal football schedule

Coaches

Game summaries

Oregon State

Arizona State

TCU

San Jose State

Washington

Notre Dame

Arizona

UCLA

The week before, the Cardinal beat Arizona 24–23 in an exciting conference game, while the Bruins lost a close game to the Ducks. UCLA had a record of 44–31–3 on the Cardinal before game time.

With ten seconds left in this UCLA's homecoming game and the Bruins behind by four points, Bruin quarterback Kevin Craft passed to freshman Cory Harkey for a 7-yard touchdown to win the game, 23–20, over the Stanford Cardinal in the northeast corner of the Rose Bowl Saturday afternoon. Two turnovers by the Bruins led to the 14 Stanford points in the first half.

In the game, Craft had 285 passing yards and Taylor Embree caught 72 yards, while Stanford's Toby Gerhart rushed for 138 yards.

Washington State

Oregon

USC

California

The Cardinal traveled up to Berkeley in an attempt to hold on to the Axe and earn a bowl berth with a sixth win. The Bears led 10–3 at the half and ran up 20 unanswered points in the third quarter. Stanford was able to score two quick back to back touchdowns in the fourth quarter but could not close a 21–point deficit. Tavita Pritchard threw for 306 yards and a score while Toby Gerhart rushed for 103 yards and a score. Although the loss relinquished the Axe to Cal and prevented Stanford from becoming bowl eligible, Harbaugh set the standards even higher for 2009 by declaring that "Bowl Championship Series eligible is what we’re aiming for."

References

Stanford
Stanford Cardinal football seasons
Stanford Cardinal football